Jose Bejar Cruz Jr. (born September 17, 1932) is a noted control theorist and a Distinguished Professor of Engineering in the Department of Electrical and Computer Engineering, Ohio State University.

Cruz was elected a member of the National Academy of Engineering in 1980 for contributions to the control of large-scale systems with multiple goals and to sensitivity analysis. He is also a Fellow of the American Association for the Advancement of Science, the Institute of Electrical and Electronics Engineers, the International Federation of Automatic Control, and the American Society for Engineering Education. He is also the recipient of the IEEE Centennial Medal in 1984, the Richard E. Bellman Control Heritage Award in 1994, and the IEEE James H. Mulligan, Jr. Education Medal in 2009.

Early life and education
He is a native of the town of Malolos, the capital of the province of Bulacan in the Philippines.  He completed his secondary studies at the Bulacan Provincial High School in his native town.  He then went to the University of the Philippines, Diliman, Quezon City, Philippines, for his college studies.  There, he completed his BS in Electrical Engineering, summa cum laude, in 1953, the first recipient of such an honor from the university.  The following year, he journeyed to the US and earned an MS for Electrical Engineering from the MIT in Cambridge.  Subsequently, he got his PhD in Electrical Engineering from the University of Illinois, Urbana, Illinois.  He has spent most of his adult life in the US.

Biography
 Ph.D. in Electrical Engineering University of Illinois Urbana, IL, October 1959
 S.M. in Electrical Engineering Massachusetts Institute of Technology Cambridge, MA, June 1956
 B.S. in Electrical Engineering, summa cum laude University of the Philippines Quezon City, April 1953

References

External links
 Home Page
 

Richard E. Bellman Control Heritage Award recipients
Living people
People from Malolos
Members of the United States National Academy of Engineering
University of the Philippines Diliman alumni
IEEE Centennial Medal laureates
Fellows of the American Association for the Advancement of Science
Fellow Members of the IEEE
Fellows of the International Federation of Automatic Control
Fellows of the American Society for Engineering Education
1932 births
American electrical engineers